The Governor of Lipetsk Oblast is the highest official of that region of Russia. The status and powers of the Head of Administration are determined in Chapter 5 of the Lipetsk Oblast Charter.

History of office 
In the late 1991, the President of Russia Boris Yeltsin appointed the heads of the executive authorities in the regions.

So, on 23 October, by the presidential decree, Gennady Kuptsov was appointed Head of Administration of Lipetsk Oblast. On 23 December 1992, he was dismissed by Yeltsin. Disagreeing with the decision, Kuptsov filed a lawsuit against the president, demanding reinstatement for himself. In September 1994, the Moscow City Court overturned the president's decision, but Kuptsov was not reinstated in the administration, since the new governor had already been elected.

Lipetsk Oblast became one of the first regions of the Russian Federation, where the direct elections of the head of the region were held, on 11 April 1993. In 1999, a two-term limit was introduced.

Unlike other leaders of Russian oblasts, Oleg Korolyov, elected in 1998, did not support the usage of the word “governor”, keeping style himself as Head of Administration. Administrations of Lipetsk and Tambov Oblasts explain this by the fact that there are no governorates in modern Russia.

In 2004, on the initiative of the President of Russia Vladimir Putin, the procedure for electing the highest officials of the regions was changed from the popular vote to appointment by the legislative bodies from the list of candidacies submitted by the President. Despite the fact that Oleg Korolyov's second term was expected to end only in April 2007, in mid-May 2005 he prematurely resigned, and on May 24 Putin submitted his candidacy to the regional council. The same procedure took place in April 2010.

Korolyov was reelected in 2014 and resigned in October 2018, moving to the Senate. He was succeeded by Igor Artamonov.

On 26 May 2022, Lipetsk Oblast Council of Deputies adopted amendments to the Charter, renaming the office of the Head of Administration into Governor of Lipetsk Oblast.

List

References 

 
Politics of Lipetsk Oblast
Lipetsk